Restless Night or Restless Nights may refer to:

Film
Restless Night (1958)

Literature
Unruhige Nacht (Restless Night), 1950 story by Albrecht Goes
Restless Night 1990 novel by Charlotte Hughes

Music

Albums
Restless Night (Ray Dolan album) 1975
Restless Night, 1971 debut album of Octopus (English band) 
Restless Night, Julianna Raye 2002
Restless Nights (Karla Bonoff album) 1979

Songs
"Restless Night", The Incredible String Band from Earthspan
"Restless Night" (לילה לא שקט, Layla Lo Shaket) hit song by Shlomo Artzi
"Restless Night", from Dragon Ball Z 3 Original Soundtrack
"Restless Nights", song by Scorpions B-side of Wind of Change, from album Crazy World
"Restless Nights", by Bruce Springsteen from Tracks (Bruce Springsteen album)
"Restless Nights", by Lalo Schifrin composed by Lalo Schifrin 1983 The Osterman Weekend 
"Restless Nights", by Memphis Slim
"Restless Nights", by Karla Bonoff composed by Karla Bonoff